Medal of Valor (Uzbek: Жасорат Медалью), also known as the Courage medal, the Jasorat medal, or Zhasorat medal, is one of the orders and medals of the Republic of Uzbekistan. It is awarded for the demonstration of courage, professionality, and loyalty to Uzbekistan.

Regulation 
1. Military servicemen of Uzbekistan, employees of the State Security Service, National Guard and internal affairs bodies are awarded with the Courage medal for their courage and bravery during the performance of military duty or service duty in ensuring the national security of the republic, maintaining public order, saving people's lives, saving state and public property during natural disasters, fires, and other emergency situations, and fighting crime. Both citizens and non-citizens of Uzbekistan can be awarded with the Medal of Valor.

2. The Medal of Valor is awarded by the President of Uzbekistan, with the decree of the awarding published in the press and other mass media.

3. Awarding of the Medal of Valor is done according to the approval of the Ministry of Defense of Uzbekistan, the State Security Service of Uzbekistan, the State Security Service of the President of Uzbekistan, the National Guard of Uzbekistan, the Ministry of Internal Affairs of Uzbekistan, the chairman of the Dzhokorgi Council of the Republic of Karakalpakstan, the mayors of the regions and the city of Tashkent.

4. The Medal of Valor and the corresponding document related to this award will be presented in a ceremony by the President of Uzbekistan, or on their behalf by the Speaker of the Legislative Chamber of the Oliy Majlis, the chairman of the senate of the Oliy Majlis, the Prime Minister of Uzbekistan, the Minister of Defense of Uzbekistan, the chairman of State Security Service of Uzbekistan, the chairman of the State Security Service of the President of Uzbekistan, the commander of the National Guard of Uzbekistan, the Minister of Internal Affairs of Uzbekistan, the chairman of the Dzhokorg Council of the Republic of Karakalpakstan, governors of the regions and the city of Tashkent, as well as other persons on the instructions of the President of Uzbekistan.

5. Individuals awarded with the Medal of Valor will receive a one-time monetary award in the amount of ten times the minimum wage. They will also enjoy privileges specified by the law.

6. The Medal of Valor is worn on the left side of the chest.

7. In the case of posthumous awarding of the Medal of Valor, the medal, the relevant document on awarding, and a one-time monetary award shall be handed over to the family of the awardee.

Description 
The Medal of Valor is made of a copper alloy first plated with 0.5 micron nickel, then 0.25 micron gold, and has a diameter of 34 millimeters. The obverse of the medal, covered with air-colored enamel, depicts an equestrian warrior holding a shield and sword, symbolizing glory and valor, against a background of sun and radiating rays. "JASORAT" ("courage" or "valor" in Uzbek) is printed in 2 millimeter raised letters on a red enamel background at the bottom of the medal. The edges of the medal are surrounded by a thick red circle on both sides, and on the front by an additional 0.8 millimeter. The national coat of arms of the Republic of Uzbekistan is depicted on the back of the medal. Below, the number of the medal is written in 1 millimeter font. The medal is 3 millimeters thick and is attached to a five-sided pin covered with a three-color striped silk fabric ribbon 24 millimeters wide using a ring and a loop. A 4 millimetre wide green line runs through the middle of the fabric with a 1 millimeter wide white road on both sides of it. On either side of these lines, are 2 millimeter wide green tracks and 5 millimeter wide red tracks. 2 millimeter wide green lines pass through the edges of the fabric. The height of the pin is 48 millimeters, and the width is 45 millimeters. The medal is worn with a clasp.

See also
Orders, decorations, and medals of Uzbekistan

References 

Military awards and decorations
Orders, decorations, and medals of Uzbekistan
1994 establishments in Uzbekistan